Ptarmigan Lake is one of a trio of lakes that form a small endorheic basin in Cochrane District, Ontario, Canada.

The primary outflow is a small creek that flows through Swallow Lake to Pelican Lake, which has no outlet.

See also
List of lakes in Ontario

References

Lakes of Cochrane District